Harold I. Zimmerman (1891 – December 5, 1967) was an American football and basketball coach. He served as the head football coach (1912–1913) and head basketball coach (1912–1914) at Millersville University of Pennsylvania. He later served as the head football coach at Ursinus College in Collegeville, Pennsylvania.

Zimmerman died on December 5, 1967, at the age of 76.

Head coaching record

College football

References

External links
 

1891 births
1967 deaths
Millersville Marauders football coaches
Millersville Marauders men's basketball coaches
Ursinus Bears football coaches
Ursinus Bears men's basketball coaches
High school football coaches in Pennsylvania
People from Chester County, Pennsylvania